Corn oil (North American) or maize oil (British) is oil extracted from the germ of corn (maize). Its main use is in cooking, where its high smoke point makes refined corn oil a valuable frying oil. It is also a key ingredient in some margarines. Corn oil is generally less expensive than most other types of vegetable oils.

Corn oil is also a feedstock used for biodiesel. Other industrial uses for corn oil include soap, salve, paint, erasers, rustproofing for metal surfaces, inks, textiles, nitroglycerin, and insecticides. It is sometimes used as a carrier for drug molecules in pharmaceutical preparations.

Production

Almost all corn oil is expeller-pressed, then solvent-extracted using hexane or 2-methylpentane (isohexane). The solvent is evaporated from the corn oil, recovered, and re-used. After extraction, the corn oil is then refined by degumming and/or alkali treatment, both of which remove phosphatides. Alkali treatment also neutralizes free fatty acids and removes color (bleaching). Final steps in refining include winterization (the removal of waxes), and deodorization by steam distillation of the oil at  under a high vacuum.

Some specialty oil producers manufacture unrefined, 100%-expeller-pressed corn oil. This is a more expensive product since it has a much lower yield than the combination expeller and solvent process, as well as a smaller market share.

Constituents and comparison

 Of the saturated fatty acids, 80% are palmitic acid (lipid number of C16:0), 14% stearic acid (C18:0), and 3% arachidic acid (C20:0).
 Over 99% of the monounsaturated fatty acids are oleic acid (C18:1 cis-9)
 98% of the polyunsaturated fatty acids are the omega-6 linoleic acid (C18:2 n-6).

See also
 Corn wet-milling

References

Further reading

External links
 Institute of Shortening and Edible Oils
 The Maize Page

Cooking oils
Vegetable oils
Maize products